Season 2016–17 is the 17th of Veria in Super League Greece. Veria will compete in the following competitions Super League and Greek Cup. The season covers the period from 1 July 2015 to 30 June 2016.

Players

Squad information

Out on loan

Transfers

Summer Transfers

In:

Out:

Winter Transfers

In:

Out:

Technical and medical staff

Veria Academy

Season Milestones
Veria will compete in the 2016–17 Super League Greece for 6th consecutive season. This is the first time ever to happen in her history.
On May 8, 2016, Karipidis stated in an interview for "Real News" that he's very close to seal a deal with a Chinese company on selling Veria's shares.
Konstantinos Papadopoulos is the new major shareholder of Veria.
Zisis Vryzas quit his post on 3 July 2016.
Following Vryzas' departure, Eleftheropoulos quit his manager position along with Venetidis on 6 July 2016.
Alekos Vosniadis was appointed as the new club manager on 8 July 2016.
On 8 September 2016, Committee of Professional Sports didn't allow the transfer of the club's shares from Theodoros Karipidis to Konstantinos Papadopoulos, as a result Veria wasn't grant a permission of participation to the 2016–17 Super League Greece championship and they are facing a relegation penalty to Football League or even a ban from all the professional football championships.
On 22 September 2016, Committee of Professional Sports granted to Veria, the permission of participating to 2016–17 Super League Greece as well as they approved the transfer shares of 93,53% from Theodoros Karipidis to Konstantinos Papadopoulos. Veria was fined €15,000 for their incomplete file on their first attempt.
On 23 September 2016, Alekos Vosniadis left the club.
On 24 September 2016, Thomas Grafas was appointed as the new club manager.

Fixtures & Results

Overall

Last updated: 17 April 2016Source: Competitions

Pre-season Friendlies

Mid-season Friendlies

Fixtures

Last updated: 3 October 2016Source: Superleague Greece

Tickets
Updated to games played on August 2016, as published on superleaguegreece.net. Games are counted without games played behind closed gates.

League table

Results summary

Results by matchday

Greek Cup

Second round

Last updated: 3 October 2016Source: HFF

Players Statistics

OverallUpdated as of 18 September 2016. ''

Source: Superleague Greece

Goals

Last updated: 28 September 2016
Source: Match reports in Competitive matches  0 shown as blank

Assists

Last updated: 28 September 2016
Source: Match reports in Competitive matches  0 shown as blank

Best goal and MVP awards and nominees

Source: Best of Superleague 2016–2017

References

Veria F.C. seasons
Veria F.C.